James Beaton (1473–1539) was a Scottish church leader, Archbishop of Glasgow and Archbishop of St Andrews

James Beaton may also refer to:
 James Beaton (archbishop of Glasgow) (1517–1603)
 Jim Beaton (James Wallace Beaton, born 1943), former Queen's Police Officer and bodyguard